New Farmington is an unincorporated community in Jackson Township, Jackson County, Indiana.

History
New Farmington was laid out in 1852. A post office was established at New Farmington in 1852, and remained in operation until it was discontinued in 1868.

Geography

References

Unincorporated communities in Jackson County, Indiana
Unincorporated communities in Indiana